The 1846 Delaware gubernatorial special election was held on November 3, 1846. A year into the term of Whig Governor Thomas Stockton, elected in 1844, he died, elevating State Senate Speaker Joseph Maull to the governorship. Maull, in turn, also died, making State House Speaker William Temple Governor. Former State Representative Peter F. Causey ran as the Whig nominee to succeed Temple, and faced former State Senator William Tharp, the Democratic nominee from 1844. Tharp narrowly defeated Causey, returning the Governorship to the Democratic Party.

General election

Results

References

Bibliography
 
 
 

1846
Delaware
Gubernatorial
Delaware 1846